Traveller Alien Module 1: Aslan is a 1984 role-playing game supplement for Traveller, Written by J. Andrew Keith, John Harshman, and Marc W. Miller, cover by David Deitrick, and published by Game Designers' Workshop. Part of the classic Traveller Alien Modules series.

Contents
Aslan is the first module in a series detailing the major alien races in Traveller.

Reception
Craig Sheeley reviewed Aslan in Space Gamer No. 70. Sheeley commented that "Aslan is an excellent module.  I recommend it without hesitation.  It's worth more than [the price]."

Steve Nutt reviewed Alien Module: Aslan for Imagine magazine, and stated that "All in all, this is a good buy. An Aslan-based campaign would be very different indeed."

Bob McWilliams reviewed Aslan, Alien Module 1 for White Dwarf #65, giving it an overall rating of 9 out of 10, and stated that "For the most part I was not disappointed with Aslan ('Adventure
and Intrigue with a Proud Warrior Race'). Naturally I could have done with even more social and historical background than is provided, but what you get inside the folder-type cover is a 40-page booklet jam-packed with detail."

Reviews
 Different Worlds #37 (Nov./Dec., 1984)

See also
 List of Classic Traveller Alien Modules

References

Role-playing game supplements introduced in 1984
Traveller (role-playing game) supplements